Neagoe or Neagoie is a Romanian surname of Bulgarian origin - a variation of the medieval male Bulgarian name Няголь (Niagolь), modern Niagol. The name is derived from the Old Bulgarian and Old Slavic word neaga (care, nurture) and means "caretaker", someone who takes good care of those around him.     

One of the oldest attestations of Neagoe as a given name is Neagoe Basarab, Voivode (Prince) of Wallachia between 1512 and 1521, from the old princely family of Basarab (probably of cumanic origin).

People with the surname 

Notable people with the surname include:

Andrei Neagoe (born 1987), Romanian footballer
Eugen Neagoe (born 1967), Romanian footballer and manager
Gogu Neagoe (born 1976), Romanian cartoonist
Nicolae Neagoe (born 1941), Romanian bobsledder
Peter Neagoe (1881–1960), American writer and painter
Robert Neagoe (born 1982), Romanian footballer
Ştefan Neagoe (1838–1897), Romanian educator and writer

People with the given name 

 Neagoe Basarab, Voivode (Prince) of Wallachia between 1512 and 1521

See also 

 Neagu
 Neagoe Basarab
 All pages with titles beginning with Neagoe
 All pages with titles containing Neagoe

Romanian-language surnames
Romanian masculine given names
Given names
Surnames